This is a list of notable footballers who have played for Grimsby Town. Generally, this means players that have played 100 or more league matches for the club. However, some players who have played fewer matches are also included; this includes players that have had considerable success at other clubs.
 
Players are listed in alphabetical order. Appearances and goals are for league matches only; wartime matches are excluded. Substitute appearances included.

As of 1 November 2008.

A

B

C

D

E

F

G

H

I

J

K

L

M

N

O

P

Q

R

S

T

U

V

W

X

Y

Z

Key
 GK — Goalkeeper
 RB — Right back
 LB — Left back
 FB — Fullback
 CB — Centre back
 WH — Wing half
 MF — Midfielder
 FW — Forward

References
 Player database at thefishy.co.uk
 
 Since 1888 - Football league statistics (requires registration)
 

Players
 
Players
Grimsby Town F.C. players
Association football player non-biographical articles